The 2018–19 Texas Southern Tigers basketball team represents Texas Southern University during the 2018–19 NCAA Division I men's basketball season. The Tigers, led by first-year head coach Johnny Jones, play their home games at the Health and Physical Education Arena in Houston, Texas as members of the Southwestern Athletic Conference.

Previous season 
The Tigers finished the 2017–18 season 16–20, 12–6 in SWAC play to finish in a three-way tie for second place. Due to Grambling State's Academic Progress Rate violations and subsequent postseason ineligibility, they received the No. 3 seed in the SWAC tournament where they defeated Alabama State, Prairie View A&M and Arkansas–Pine Bluff to become SWAC Tournament champions. They received the SWAC's automatic bid to the NCAA tournament where they defeated North Carolina Central in the First Four before losing in the first round to Xavier.

On June 5, 2018, head coach Mike Davis announced he would step down as head coach to become the head coach at Detroit, which was made official on June 13. On June 25, the school hired Nevada associate head coach and former North Texas and LSU head coach Johnny Jones for the job.

Roster

Schedule and results

|-
! colspan="9" style=| Non-conference regular season

|-
!colspan=9 style=|SWAC regular season

|-
!colspan=9 style="background:#000000; color:#FFD700;"| SWAC tournament

|-
!colspan=9 style="background:#000000; color:#FFD700;"| CollegeInsider.com Postseason tournament

References

Texas Southern Tigers basketball seasons
Texas Southern
Texas Southern Tigers basketball
Texas Southern Tigers basketball
Texas Southern